Kumaun Institute of Information Technology (KIIT) is an educational institute in Kathgodam, Uttarakhand.

Background
KIIT is established by Uttrakhand Shiksha Prasar Samiti. KIIT is affiliated to Kumaun University, Nainital.

Courses

 Bachelor of Computer Application (B.C.A.)
 Duration: 3 years
 Eligibility: 10+2 or its equivalent with minimum 45% marks
 Bachelor of Business Administration (B.B.A.)
 Duration: 3 years
 Eligibility: 10+2 or its equivalent with minimum 45% marks
 Post Graduation Diploma in Computer Application (PGDCA)
 Duration: 1 year
 Eligibility: Graduation or its equivalent with minimum 45% marks

References

Universities and colleges in Uttarakhand
Haldwani-Kathgodam
Educational institutions in India with year of establishment missing